Ehrenfried Walther von Tschirnhaus (or Tschirnhauß, ; 10 April 1651 – 11 October 1708) was a German mathematician, physicist, physician, and philosopher. He introduced the Tschirnhaus transformation and is considered by some to have been the inventor of European porcelain, an invention long accredited to Johann Friedrich Böttger but others claim porcelain had been made by English manufacturers at an even earlier date.

Biography 
Von Tschirnhaus was born in Kieslingswalde (now Sławnikowice in western Poland) and died in Dresden, Saxony.

Education 
Von Tschirnhaus attended the Gymnasium at Görlitz. Thereafter he studied mathematics, philosophy, and medicine at the University of Leiden. He traveled considerably in France, Italy, and Switzerland, and served in the army of Holland (1672–1673). During his travels he met Baruch de Spinoza and Christiaan Huygens in the Netherlands, Isaac Newton in England, and Gottfried Wilhelm Leibniz (with whom he maintained a lifelong correspondence) in Paris. He became a member of the Académie Royale des Sciences in Paris.

The mathematician 

The Tschirnhaus transformation, by which he removed certain intermediate terms from a given algebraic equation, is well known. It was published in the scientific journal Acta Eruditorum in 1683.

In 1682, Von Tschirnhaus worked out the theory of catacaustics and showed that they were rectifiable. This was the second case in which the envelope of a moving line was determined. One of the catacaustics of a parabola still is known as Tschirnhausen cubic.

In 1696, Johann Bernoulli posed the problem of the brachistochrone to the readers of Acta Eruditorum. Tschirnhaus was one of only five mathematicians to submit a solution. Bernoulli published these contributions (including Tschirnhaus') along with his own in the journal in May of the following year.

Von Tschirnhaus produced various types of lenses and mirrors, some of them are displayed in museums. He erected a large glass works in Saxony, where he constructed burning glasses of unusual perfection and carried on his experiments (1687–1688).

His work Medicina mentis sive artis inveniendi praecepta generali (1687) combines methods of deduction with empiricism and shows him to be philosophically connected to the Enlightenment.

Philosophy 
Tschirnhaus was for many years forgotten as a philosopher and the studies treating the subject often discuss Tschirnhaus' connection to other philosophers and scientists at the time. During his time at the University of Leiden he started correspondence with Spinoza and later also Leibniz. Tschirnhaus was one of the first to get a copy of Spinoza's masterpiece Ethics.

Inventor of porcelain 
After he returned home to Saxony, von Tschirnhaus initiated systematic experiments, using mixtures of various silicates and earths at different temperatures to develop porcelain, which at the time was available only as a costly import from China and Japan. As early as 1704, he showed “porcelan” to Leibniz's secretary. He proposed the establishment of a porcelain factory to Augustus II of Poland, Elector of Saxony, but was denied. Also in 1704, von Tschirnhaus became the supervisor of Johann Friedrich Böttger, a nineteen-year-old alchemist who claimed to be able to make gold. Böttger only reluctantly and under pressure started to participate in Tschirnhaus’ work by 1707. The use of kaolin (from Schneeberg, Saxony) and alabaster advanced the work, so that August II named him the director of the porcelain factory he intended to establish. The Elector ordered payment of 2,561 thalers to von Tschirnhaus, but the recipient requested postponement until the factory was producing. When Von Tschirnhaus died suddenly, on 11 October 1708, the project came to a halt.

Three days after Von Tschirnhaus's death, there was a burglary at his house and, according to a report by Böttger, a small piece of porcelain was stolen. This report suggests that Böttger himself recognized that Von Tschirnhaus already knew how to make porcelain, a key piece of evidence that Von Tschirnhaus and not Böttger was the inventor. Work resumed on 20 March 1709, by which time Melchior Steinbrück had arrived to assess the dead man's estate, which included the notes about making porcelain, and had met with Böttger. On 28 March 1709, Böttger went to August II and announced the invention of porcelain. Böttger now was nominated to head the first European manufactory for porcelain. Steinbrück became an inspector and married Böttger's sister.

Contemporary testimonies of knowledgeable people indicate that Tschirnhaus invented porcelain. In 1719, for example, Samuel Stölzel of the porcelain factory of Meissen went to Vienna with the still-secret recipe and confirmed that it had been invented by Von Tschirnhaus and not by Böttger. In that same year, the General Secretary of the Meissen factory also indicated that the invention was not Böttger's “but by the late Herr von Tschirnhaus[,] whose written science” was handed to Böttger “by the inspector Steinbrück.” Nevertheless, Böttger's name became closely associated with the invention.

Works

 Medicina corporis, Amsterdam, 1686.
 Medicina mentis, Amsterdam, 1687.
 Medicina mentis et corporis, with an Introduction by Wilhelm Risse. (Anastatic reprint) Hildesheim: Georg Olms, 1964.

See also 
 List of German inventors and discoverers
 Generalized conic

Notes

References 
 This article or a previous version of it is partially based on the public domain A Short Account of the History of Mathematics (4th edition, 1908) by W.W. Rouse Ball, as transcribed at Some Contemporaries of Descartes, Fermat, Pascal and Huygens: Tchirnhausen
  A significant part of the article is based on the corresponding German Wikipedia website from February 2, 2006 that contains references about the Böttger–Tschirnhaus controversy.
 
 
 Hans-Joachim Böttcher: Ehrenfried Walther von Tschirnhaus - Das bewunderte, bekämpfte und totgeschwiegene Genie. Dresden 2014.

External links 
 
 
 
 Website of the Tschirnhausgesellschaft
 Ehrenfried Walther von Tschirnhaus (site "under construction", with broken image links; not clear that the site has not been abandoned...)
 Gunter E. Grimm: Argumentation und Schreibstrategie. Zum Vulkanismus-Diskurs im Werk von Ehrenfried Walther von Tschirnhaus
 A method for removing all intermediate terms from a given equation English translation (by R.F. Green) of his 1683 paper

1651 births
1708 deaths
17th-century German mathematicians
18th-century German mathematicians
17th-century German inventors
Members of the French Academy of Sciences
People from the Electorate of Saxony
Leiden University alumni
Meissen porcelain
17th-century German writers
17th-century German male writers
People associated with Baruch Spinoza
18th-century German inventors